= Shorting =

Shorting may refer to:

- Short selling a stock
- Causing a short circuit
